is a Japanese franchise which includes an OVA series animated by AIC, a manga by Yūki Nakano, and a 26-episode anime television series that aired on TV Tokyo from October 1997 to March 1998.

A reboot manga, Pale Blue Dot: Battle Athletes Daiundōkai ReSTART!, was serialized from July 2020 to March 2021, and a new anime series was announced. The new anime television series by Seven aired from April to June 2021 on TV Asahi's  block. Crunchyroll, formerly Funimation, licensed the new series and the English dub debuted on September 27, 2022.

Plot

Battle Athletes
Battle Athletes is a six-episode OVA set in the distant future where, after many years of war with an extraterrestrial race, a contest of physical strength between one representative from each race is agreed. Although the alien race is far superior to the humans, the human champion prevailed, marking an era of peace for humanity. A University Satellite is created where the greatest athletes of the age train with women competing for the title of Cosmic Beauty.

Akari Kanzaki, daughter of a former Cosmic Beauty, arrives at the University Satellite excited and ready to compete. After watching defending Cosmic Beauty Lahrri run faster than she ever has despite the artificial gravity being turned up, Akari realizes just how far she needs to go. Helping her are her fellow team members and roommates Kris Christopher, a soon-to-be priestess from the moon, and Anna Respighi, a shy girl with a secret so hidden even she is unaware of it. Kris is marked as a standout athlete and competes on a level near Lahrri drawing the wrath of another top competitor Mylandah onto the team as they prepare for the final competition.

Battle Athletes Victory
The television series is not a sequel to the OVA, but a complete retelling of the story. The basic premise of the series remain intact, as Akari still strives for the title of Cosmic Beauty, but the plot line and characterizations are often radically different. The characters and stories of this series tend to be more outrageous in tone than the first series.

The story begins with Akari Kanzaki at a school on Antarctica in the year 4999. There are a series of tests that she and her classmates must go through to determine who'll be the representatives to go to University Satellite, a satellite training facility. Living under the shadow of her mother, the legendary Cosmic Beauty Tomoe Midou, Akari, emotionally fragile in this version, struggles as the worst athlete at the training school. Eventually, with the help of her best friend Ichan, Akari succeeds in making it to the University Satellite where she competes for the title of Cosmic Beauty and trains for a mission that will decide the fate of the human race.

Battle Athletes Victory ReSTART!
In the year 5100, elite athletes from around the solar system compete to become Cosmic Beauty, the champion of a huge athletic tournament.

Characters

Born in Hokkaido, Japan on March 23, 4983.16 years old. She is the daughter of Tomoe Midou, a former Cosmo Beauty. She's determined to follow in the footsteps of her mother in order to be Cosmo Beauty. However; she is usually ditzy, clumsy, and sometimes a crybaby. In the TV series, whenever she is embarrassed she hides in a cardboard box labeled .
She starts the series as one of the worst students. But it is revealed later, however, that she is not truly inept, but had very little confidence in herself and was unable to cope with the death of her mother. After she was demoralized by top student Jessie and retreated to her home, Ichino visited her and she returns to school with new determination, and then demonstrated a rapid improvement in skill, even defeating Jessie in the final exam race.
Towards the end of the series, after meeting several greater challenges and struggles, she becomes stronger and confident in herself, and successfully reaches the final race for Cosmo Beauty alongside her friend and teammate Kris. 
In the OVAs, as she becomes stronger and more confident, she cuts her hair short. Her hobby is to read.

She was born on December 31, 4982, in Osaka, Japan. She is the best friend of Akari and, like her, also wants to become Cosmo Beauty. She cares for Akari very much, and always tried to help her when Akari was struggling. But when Akari rapidly improved herself, Ichino feels threatened and, in their last race against each other, Ichino fractured her right ankle; losing her chance to compete for the prestigious University Satellite, much to both their depression. In the end, Akari went on to enter the University with blessings from Ichino. After her full recovery, she later helps Akari in defeating the Nerillians. Initially her feelings for Akari are ambiguous until near the end of the series where she confesses her feelings towards her. She likes playing Shougi (Japanese chess) and is a big fan of the Osaka Tigers. Her personality is more upbeat, positive than Akari. She does not appear in the OVAs.

She was born on May 5th, 4984 in Johannesburg, South Africa. She is fourteen years old, enjoys hunting and fortune-telling, and has a voracious appetite; her personality is described as willful. She is very childlike, hyperactive, and even somewhat wild, and would occasionally run on all fours like an animal. She passes the Antarctica final exam in third place, and gets accepted into the University Satellite alongside Akari and Jessie. However, she's unable to enter the competition for Cosmo Beauty due to her team being defeated by Akari's, but even still Tanya still remains good friends with her.

She was born on July 10th, 4981 in New York City, United States. Living in poverty and having lost both of her parents when she was young, Jessie was forced to work hard to care for her younger siblings, especially her ill younger sister. She was then taken in by a priest and, with the encouragement of Tomoe Midou, she resolves to become Cosmo Beauty. She is very hardworking and was the top student of the school in Antarctica, holding a great deal of admiration for Tomoe Midou, even wanting to become her. However, she is also a perfectionist and overachiever. Because of this, she strongly detested Akari, whom she views as weak and unworthy to be called Tomoe's daughter. The only classmate she felt any sort of respect for was her rival, Ayla. She is highly critical of weakness, including her own. She is never seen praising or encouraging others not as good as her, and becomes embittered and even heartbroken when she is surpassed which ultimately leads to her resigning from the prestigious University Satellite after being unable to compete with top student, Larrie Fel Donato. In the original manga story, however, she is a friendly rival of Akari and does not resent her; rather she views Akari as one of her best friends. Jessie also enjoys dancing, motorsports and playing piano.

She was born on May 8th, 4981 in Moscow, Russia. She has a cold and distant personality, but she is actually quite nice and becomes friends with Akari, Ichino, and Tarnya. She was one of the Antarctica school's top students, a rival of Jessie, and the only one Jessie showed any respect for. She joined the school of Antarctica in order to bring honor to her country. However, after finding out that her country was conquered, she decided to quit. She later marries her swimming instructor, Sergei, and they have a child together, whom she named Jessie, in honor of her former rival. Swimming is her favorite sport. She does not appear in the OVAs.

She was born on August 12th, 4982 in Hong Kong. She uses various cheating methods in order to win but still always ends up losing in the end. However, she sneaks into the Satellite University, wearing a pink wing and going by the name "Marshall". She serves as the comic relief of the show. She enjoys bicycling. She doesn't appear in the OVAs.

An agrarian priestess from the Moon and member of Akari's team in the University Satellite, born January 1st, 4982. She is roommates with Akari and Anna at the University Satellite. She has strange habits, such as walking around the dorm naked, and she also has a pet cow called "Gyubei", whose milk she cannot live without. She falls in love with Akari at first sight, much to Akari's shock. But as Akari bonds with her teammates, they become close friends, and competed with each other in the final race for Cosmo Beauty. She becomes love rivals with Ichino.

A girl from Satellite Colony 7, born August 7th, 4982. In the OVA, Anna is enrolled in the University Satellite by his mother. Eventually, it is revealed that Anna is a boy and was raised to be a girl. Because of this, Anna transfers out of the Girls' satellite and moves into the Boy's satellite. In the TV series, she is a girl, de facto. She becomes Akari's and Kris' teammate and friend in the University Satellite. She is a cute girl who enjoys cooking. However, her psyche possesses an inner rage that occasionally makes her become hostile. In the past, she and her twin sister Elaine fought for the attention of their mother, which led to Anna injuring Elaine in an act of jealousy during a game. By the end, the two later make up and become sisters again.

A senior student from Satellite Colony 3, born February 10th, 4980. She's one of the top students in the University Satellite, but also the most brutal, aggressive, and dangerous, which led her to continue her training in the school's detention prison away from the others. She was once friends with Larrie, up until the final round which resulted in her losing the Cosmo Beauty title to her. This caused her to become obsessed with defeating Larrie, which was more important to her than even the title of Cosmo Beauty. During the Cosmo Beauty competition, she cruelly injured Anna during their tennis match, knocking Anna out of the competition and earning Kris' anger. Both Miranda and Larrie were defeated in the semifinals by Akari and Kris, just one match away from racing against Larrie in the final race for Cosmo Beauty. She and Larrie continued their rivalry afterwards, on friendlier terms. In the OVAs, she gets expelled from the satellite.

A senior Mongolian student, born June 30th, 4980. She was the top student at the University Satellite and winner of the Cosmo Beauty title 2 years in a row. She is so powerful that she is the only student (alongside her rival, Miranda) without a teammate, defeating all other three-girl teams by herself. She's devoid of emotion, focuses only on being the best, and is dismissive of everything and everyone else. Despite already holding the title of Cosmo Beauty, she remains unsatisfied until she can break Tomoe Midou's universal running record. She initially had no respect for the cheerful and friendly Akari because she believed that the only way to succeed and win is to be how she is: completely machine-like. But after seeing how happy and fulfilled Akari was during their semifinal match, Larrie realized what she had lost, and was defeated by Akari, finally losing her title as Cosmo Beauty. In the past, Larrie was more friendly and sociable with a great love for sports. When they first competed with each other, she noticed how unhappy Miranda was and suggested they become rivals and compete with each other, so that Miranda can see how fun sports can be. Sometime afterwards, she focused only on winning and nothing else, and adopted her robotic drive to succeed. This caused her to break up her friendship with Miranda and the two have been bitter rivals ever since. But after the two of them were defeated in the Cosmo Beauty competition, they continued their rivalry with each other, this time, on friendlier terms.

The headmaster of University Satellite. He possesses super strength, and was once a top athlete who brought Earth to victory against the aliens. He is very friendly and encouraging to his students as well as highly supportive of Akari in her goal to become Cosmo Beauty. In the OVA, he is a pervert who sneaks in to the Women's dorm and bath.

Battle Athletes Victory ReSTART! Characters

Development
At first, the creation of the franchise was set for a public radio drama at start of 1996 on "Orikasa Ai's Moonlight Cafe". When the end of 1996 approached, a video game of the same name was released for the Sega Saturn system. It was followed up by the OAV series (the first video adaptation) and, some months later, by the TV version. Two more games were released eventually ("Alternative" in 1998, also for the Saturn, and "GTO" in 1999, for the PlayStation). There was also a comic adaptation, subtitled "A.D. 4999".

Media

Manga
A manga adaptation also exists. The story is very different from the anime series which involves Akari being a new candidate in the Antarctica Academy. There she meets her male instructor aa he helps her improve her skills. Akari meets some of the athletes as some become her good friends and some as her sworn rivals. There is a few differences with most of the characters:

Akari: In the anime series, she is hardly an athlete who believes she shouldn't be an athlete like her mother Tomoe Midou and believes she should quit. In the manga, she wanted to improve herself to see if she is worthy of being a true athlete like her mom.

Ichino: In the anime series, Ichino and Akari have been friends since they were twelve years old and Ichino is helping Akari to keep going of being a worthy athlete. In the manga, Ichino first met Akari when Akari enrolled to the academy and become friends right away. Ichino still acts hot-headed sometimes.

Jessie: In the anime series, Jessie acts kind to everyone except to Akari because Akari is the daughter of Tomoe Midou, for Jessie's goal is to become the next Cosmo Beauty Queen and surpass Tomoe Midou. She wants to be the best to everyone including Akari. In the manga, Jessie is a lot more cheerful and is nice to all the athletes which she doesn't see Akari as a rival but a friend. She sees all sports as her favorite hobby to do and have fun.

Tarnya: In the anime series, Tarnya has darker skin and acts all funny. She looks like a cat and acts all childish. In the manga, Tarnya is close to resemble her OVA appearance has less childlike personality and likes to do fun stuff.

Ling Pha: In the anime series, Ling Pha is a princess of China and has a selfish personality that she would do anyway of becoming the new Cosmo Beauty Queen even if it means by cheating. In the manga, Ling Pha is much kind to her friends, has a ponytail, and doesn't cheat. Her father is a very rich merchant who sells special medicine which Ling Pha gives some of her medicine to her friends to help them out, in which case the medicine backfires of that cause side effects for which Ling Pha doesn't know much about the medicines she gives out. She is close friends with Tarnya.

Ayla: In the anime series, Ayla's hair style is a wrap of pigtails and has calm personality. Ayla likes to remain calm and never losses her cool. In the manga, Ayla's hairstyle is a well groom pouf fashion and has a dark personality. She watches on all the athletes to learn of their skills and to know of their weakness as she gathers information (data) on them and take them out.

Anime

OVA

1997 series

2021 series

Reception
THEM Anime Reviews reviewed the 1997-1998 OAV series and the 1997-1998 TV series, the latter entitled Battle Athletes Victory. For the OAV series, reviewer Tim Jones criticized the art style as "recycled" and said the plot is "no winner" but that the animation and characters is what makes the OAV worth watching. He added that while the series is "hardly revolutionary," it is fun, sweet, and "riddled with eye candy." For Battle Athletes Victory, reviewer Carlos Ross said that it is different from the OAV series, as it has a "more lighthearted feel" and it has a different cast of characters, noting that while there are various stereotypes in this series, along with people of all races, there is humor, like a female character having "a crush on her female superior." Ross also said that while the animation is "beautiful" and it has a lot of "cute girl characters," the storyline is "seemingly inconsequential" and it reminds him of Gunbuster.

Notes

References

External links
 Geneon Entertainment
  
  
  
  
 AIC
  
  
  
 
 
 

1997 anime OVAs
1997 anime television series debuts
2021 anime television series debuts
Anime International Company
ASCII Media Works manga
Discotek Media
Fictional sports in anime and manga
Funimation
Geneon USA
Hideyuki Kurata
Japanese LGBT-related animated television series
Japanese science fiction television series
NBCUniversal Entertainment Japan
NUManimation
Science fiction anime and manga
Seven (animation studio)
Shōnen manga
Technical Group Laboratory
Television shows written by Yōsuke Kuroda
TV Asahi original programming
TV Tokyo original programming
Yuri (genre) anime and manga